Bhawanipur is near Areraj in the Indian state of Bihar. Bhawanipur is situated at the Bank of River Budhi-Gandak which falls in Ganga Patna.
Bhawanipur is situated at a distance of about 40 km from Motihari, the district headquarters of East Champaran district. The National Highway NH 28 provides the closest route to Motihari. Bhawanipur falls under the jurisdiction of Sangrampur Police Station. 
Bhawani Pur village has two Panchayats: - South Bhawani Pur and
North Bhawani Pur.
The famous Someshwar Shiv Madir, is located at Areraj which is at a 15-minute drive from Bhawanipur.
Bhawani Pur belongs to the Kesaria Assembly and the Purvi Champaran (Lok Sabha constituency) Lok Sabha of Bihar.

Climate
Climate is characterised by high temperatures and evenly distributed precipitation throughout the year. The Köppen Climate Classification sub-type for this climate is "Cfa" (Humid Subtropical Climate).

In 2020, Bhawanipur was among the areas which was affected by flood due to breakdown of the dam.

References

Villages in East Champaran district